Jin Jiang International (Holdings) Co., Ltd. is a Chinese state-owned tourism and hospitality company headquartered in Shanghai, China. The group operates Shanghai's Jinjiang Hotel, Peace Hotel, Park Hotel, and Metropole Hotel. Other chains operated by the group include the Jinjiang Inn and Bestay Hotel Express, and Magnotel.

In January 2015, Jin Jiang International Hotels Development Co. acquired Europe's Groupe du Louvre for 1.21 billion euros from U.S. investment firm Starwood Capital Group. In September 2015, Jin Jiang International Hotels Development Co. acquired 81% of Keystone Lodging Holding, which owns Plateno Hotels Group, 7 Days Inn and ZMAX, creating one of the world's largest hotel groups.

Interstate Hotels and Resorts manages 382 hotels and resorts in 10 countries in North America, Europe and Asia, in which Jinjiang International holds a 50 percent stake.

Corporate affairs 

Subsidiaries

Jinjiang Hotels 
Shanghai Jin Jiang International Hotels (Group) Company Limited (Jinjiang Hotels Group or Jinjiang Hotels in short) is the largest hotel group in China. It has more than 380 hotels and inns affiliated to it and under its management in major Chinese cities, including Peace Hotel and Jinjiang Inns. It is headquartered in Shanghai.

The Group's subsidiary company, Shanghai Jinjiang International Hotel Development Company Limited was listed on the Shanghai Stock Exchange in 1996. Its holding company, Shanghai Jinjiang International Hotels (Group) Company Limited H shares was listed on the Hong Kong Stock Exchange in 2006.

Jin Jiang International Hotel Management Company Ltd has its headquarters in Pudong, Shanghai.

Jinjiang Inns 

The Jinjiang Inn Co., Ltd. division has its headquarters in Minhang District, Shanghai.

The first two Jinjiang Inns in Metro Manila were scheduled to open in 2014.

Jinjiang Travel 
Shanghai Jin Jiang Tours Co., Ltd., also known as Jinjiang Travel, is headquartered in Huangpu District, Shanghai.

Other investments
Jinjiang International led a consortium to buy Radisson Hotel Group (former Carlson Rezidor Hotel Group) from fellow Chinese company HNA Group in 2018.

See also

Notes 

 Names in Chinese

References 
 Citations

External links 
 Shanghai Jin Jiang International Hotels (Group) Company Limited
 Jinjiang Hotels
 Jinjiang Inns 

Hospitality companies established in 2003
Companies based in Shanghai
Companies listed on the Shanghai Stock Exchange
Companies listed on the Hong Kong Stock Exchange
H shares
Hospitality companies of China
Hospitality companies
Hotel chains in China
Government-owned companies of China
Chinese brands